The 2011 Indian Volley League season was the debut season of the Indian Volley League, established by Volleyball federation of India in 2011. The season commenced on 29 May 2011 till 24 June 2011. First season was won by Chennai Spikers.

Chennai Spikers were the champions of the inaugural edition of the Indian Volley League.

Teams 
Six teams took part in first season of the Indian Volley League.

Points table

Awards

Matches and results

Bangalore

 Venue: Sree Kanteerva Indoor Stadium

|}

Chennai

 Venue: Jawaharlal Nehru Indoor Stadium

|}

Yenam

 Venue: YSR Indoor Stadium

|}

Hyderabad

 Venue: Kotla Vijay Bhaskar Reddy Indoor Stadium

|}

References

National volleyball leagues
Volleyball competitions in India
2011 in Indian sport